Hahausen is a village and a former municipality in the district of Goslar in Lower Saxony, Germany. Since 1 November 2021, it is part of the town Langelsheim, of which it is an Ortschaft.

It is situated northwest of the Harz mountains, between Seesen and Lutter am Barenberge. It was part of the former Samtgemeinde ("collective municipality") Lutter am Barenberge.

Geography

City districts 
 Hahausen
 Neuekrug

History

Demographics 
As of 30 June 2020 there were 765 inhabitants in Hahausen.

References

External links 

 

Goslar (district)
Duchy of Brunswick